Vanja Brodnik (born March 13, 1989) is a Slovenian alpine ski racer.

She competed at the 2015 World Championships in Beaver Creek, USA, in the Super-G.

References

1989 births
Slovenian female alpine skiers
Living people